Gnosis is the debut studio album by British progressive metal band Monuments. It was released on 27 August 2012 through Century Media Records. The album was produced by founding member and guitarist John Browne.

Music videos for the songs "97% Static" and "Regenerate" were released in support of the album.

A vinyl pressing of the album was released on 16 October 2015, including a bonus CD of the album's instrumentals. It is the band's only album with vocalist Matt Rose.

Background 
All of the material on Gnosis was composed by guitarist John Browne long before the album's release. Original vocalists Neema Askari and Greg Pope wrote lyrics for the songs, many of which were performed live during the band's early tours. Due to disagreements, the two vocalists left the band in 2011, leaving the band unable to use the lyrics written previously. In 2012, Matt Rose was recruited into the group to fill the vacancy. Though Rose re-wrote all of the album's lyrics, an issue arose when Monuments intended to release the song "Memoirs" featuring a memorable chorus whose lyrics and melody were written by Neema Askari and Joe Garrett. Askari refused to allow the use of the chorus, resulting in the song being removed from the album's track list not long before the release date. Following the album's release, "Memoirs" was released as a digital single, with all profits going to a charity of Askari and Garrett's choosing.

Track listing

Personnel 
 Monuments
 Matt Rose – vocals
 John Browne – guitar, production, mixing, engineering, concept
 Olly Steele – guitar
 Adam Swan – bass
 Mike Malyan – drums

 Additional musicians
 Spencer Sotelo of Periphery – guest vocals on track 10

 Additional personnel
 Dan Weller – vocal production
 Mazen Murad – mastering
 John Giulio Sprich – management
 Marco Walzel – booking
 Fall McKenzie – artwork, illustrations, logo

References 

2012 debut albums
Monuments (metal band) albums
Century Media Records albums